The Echoplex is a tape delay effect, first made in 1959. Designed by Mike Battle, the Echoplex set a standard for the effect in the 1960s—it is still regarded as "the standard by which everything else is measured." It was used by some of the most notable guitar players of the era; original Echoplexes are highly sought after.

The original tube Echoplex
Tape echoes work by recording sound on a magnetic tape, which is then played back; the tape speed or distance between heads determine the delay, while a feedback variable (where the delayed sound is delayed again) allows for a repetitive effect. The predecessor of the Echoplex was a tape echo designed by Ray Butts in the 1950s, who built it into a guitar amplifier called the EchoSonic. He built fewer than seventy of them and could never keep up with the demand; they were used by players like Chet Atkins, Scotty Moore, and Carl Perkins.  Electronics technician Mike Battle copied the design and built it into a portable unit; another version, however, states that Battle, working with a guitar player named Don Dixon from Akron, Ohio, perfected Dixon's original creation.

Per an interview with Echoplex inventor Mike Battle, he said "We sold the first 500 units to C.M.I. in Chicago in 1959. The Echoplex was sold through Chicago Musical Instruments, CMI." Their big innovation was the moving head, which allowed the operator to change the delay time. In 1962, their patent was bought by a company called Market Electronics in Cleveland, Ohio. Market Electronics built the units and kept designers Battle and Dixon as consultants; they marketed the units through distributor Maestro, hence the name, Maestro Echoplex. In the 1950s, Maestro was a leader in vacuum tube technology. It had close ties with Gibson, and often manufactured amplifiers for Gibson. Later, Harris-Teller of Chicago took over production. The first tube Echoplex had no number designation, but was retroactively designated the EP-1 after the unit received its first upgrade. The upgraded unit was designated the EP-2. These two units set the standard for the delay effect, with their "warm, round, thick echo." Two of Battle's improvements over earlier designs were key — the adjustable tape head, which allowed for variable delay, and a cartridge containing the tape, protecting it to retain sound quality.

The Echoplex wasn't notable just for the delay, but also for the sound; it is "still a classic today, and highly desirable for a range of playing styles ... warm, rich, and full-bodied." The delay could be turned off and the unit used as a filter, thanks to the sound of the vacuum tubes.

While Echoplexes were used mainly by guitar players (and the occasional bass player, such as Chuck Rainey, or trumpeter, such as Don Ellis or Miles Davis), many recording studios also used the Echoplex.

The solid-state Echoplex

EP-3
Market Electronics held off on using transistors while other companies made the transition.  Nevertheless, in the late 1960s they set Battle and Dixon to the task of creating the first transistor version of their product. Once the two were satisfied, beginning in the 1970s, the solid-state Echoplex was offered by Maestro and designated the EP-3, but Mike Battle, unhappy with the sound of the EP-3, sold his interest in the company. This unit offered echo, sound-on-sound, and a number of minor convenience improvements. Having been produced from 1970 to 1991, this unit enjoyed the longest production run of all the Echoplex models and was used by Eddie Van Halen, Tommy Bolin, Jimmy Page, Brian May, and many other notable guitarists of the 1970s. About the time of the public introduction of the EP-3, Maestro was taken over by Norlin Industries, then the parent company to Gibson Guitars.

EP-4

In the mid-1970s Market created an upgrade to the EP-3, designated the EP-4, adding features such as an LED input meter and tone controls and dropping the sound-on-sound feature. The EP-4 has an added output buffer to help improve impedance matching with other equipment. A compressor board based on the CA3080 transconductance amplifier was added to the record circuit of both the EP-3 and EP-4 models for a short while after the EP-4 model was introduced and then the compressor board was dropped from both the EP-3 and EP-4 models. The EP-3 model was also offered for sale alongside the EP-4 model after the EP-4 was introduced.

Battle's final consulting with Market yielded the EM-1 Groupmaster, which offered a four-channel input mixer section and a mono output section. Dissatisfied with the transistor-minded direction Maestro was taking, Battle left the company.

End of tape echo production and subsequent use of the brand

At the end of the 1970s, Norlin folded and their Maestro brand and Market Electronics was forced to find another distributor for their products. They found that distributor in Harris Teller, a Chicago musical wholesaler. Units built for Harris Teller carried an Echoplex badge that omitted the Maestro name. In 1984, Harris Teller bought out the Echoplex name and the stock of Echoplex parts from Market Electronics.  Harris Teller used the back stock to assemble reissues of the EP-3, EP-4, and tube EP-2, which they designated the EP-6t. In 1991, the thirty-year run of electro-mechanical Echoplex production finally came to an end. Towards the middle of that decade the Echoplex brand was purchased by Gibson and applied to its line of digital looping units, one of which was sold under the Oberheim brand as the Echoplex Digital Pro.

, Echoplex is a trademark of Dunlop Manufacturing, which uses it for a digital pedal that emulates the sound of tape delay.  Dunlop also created an FET-based preamp that mimics the dry path of the EP-3.

Notable users

Duane Allman 
Chet Atkins
Tommy Bolin, especially for the "ray-gun" effect heard on Billy Cobham's Spectrum
Wes Borland
Miles Davis
East Bay Ray
Don Ellis
Jerry Goldsmith 
Steve Hackett 
Eric Johnson
John Martyn
Brian May
Steve Miller 
Gary Moore
Jimmy Page
Jeff Plewman (AKA Nash the Slash) - Ran his Gibson EM200 electric mandolin and his Barcus Berry electric violins through his Echoplexes in his early career, both using the normal delay and its sound-on-sound recording to create loops. Examples of this include his work on FM's album Black Noise and his solo material, including Dreams and Nightmares.
Chuck Rainey
Randy Rhoads
Joe Satriani
Neal Schon
Sonny Sharrock
Andy Summers
Eddie Van Halen
Joe Walsh
Keller Williams
Neil Young
Doug Martsch

See also 

 Echorec
 Watkins Copicat

References

External links

 Mike Battle Interview—NAMM Oral History Library (2002)

Effects units